The Cruel Sea is a 1953 British war film starring Jack Hawkins, Donald Sinden, Denholm Elliott, Stanley Baker, Liam Redmond, Virginia McKenna and Moira Lister. Made by Ealing Studios seven years after the end of the Second World War, it was directed by Charles Frend and produced by Leslie Norman.

The film portrays the conditions in which the Battle of the Atlantic was fought between the Royal Navy and Germany's U-boats, seen from the viewpoint of the British naval officers and seamen who served in convoy escorts. It is based on the best-selling 1951 novel of the same name by former naval officer Nicholas Monsarrat, though the screenplay by Eric Ambler omits some of the novel's grimmest moments.

Plot
A voice-over by Lieutenant-Commander George Ericson (Jack Hawkins), a British Merchant Navy officer in the Royal Naval Reserve, declares:

This is a story of the Battle of the Atlantic, the story of an ocean, two ships, and a handful of men. The men are the heroes; the heroines are the ships. The only villain is the sea, the cruel sea, that man has made more cruel...

In late 1939, just as war breaks out, Ericson is recalled to the Royal Navy and given command of HMS Compass Rose, a newly built  intended for convoy escort duties. His sub-lieutenants, Lockhart and Ferraby, are both newly commissioned and without experience at sea. The new first lieutenant, James Bennett (Stanley Baker), is an abusive martinet.

Despite these initial disadvantages, the ship's company gains hard experience and becomes an effective fighting unit. At first their worst enemy is the weather, since German submarines lack the range to attack shipping far into the Atlantic. With the Fall of France, French ports become available to the Germans and U-boats can attack convoys anywhere in the Atlantic – making bad weather the convoys' greatest advantage. Germany is joined in the war by Italy, while the Spanish dictator Franco allows Axis U-boats to use Spanish harbours. The first lieutenant is put ashore due to illness, the junior officers mature and the ship crosses the Atlantic many times escorting convoys, often in brutal weather. They witness the sinking of many merchant vessels they are charged with protecting and the tragic deaths of merchant navy crewmen. A key scene involves Ericson's decision to carry out a depth charge attack even though the blast will kill merchant seamen floating in the water. After close to three years of service, including one U-boat sunk, Compass Rose is herself torpedoed and her crew forced to abandon ship. Most of the crew are lost. Taking to a couple of liferafts, Ericson survives this ordeal along with his first lieutenant, Lockhart (Donald Sinden), and with the few crew left (including Ferraby) they are picked up the next day.

Ericson is promoted commander, and together with Lockhart, his now-promoted "Number One", takes command of a new  frigate, HMS Saltash Castle. With Ericson leading an anti-submarine escort group they continue the monotonous but vital duty of convoy escort. As the war ends the ship is shown returning to port, as guard to a number of German submarines that have surrendered.

Cast

(in credits order)
 Jack Hawkins as Lieutenant Commander (later Commander) George Ericson, RNR
 Donald Sinden as Sub-Lieutenant (later Lieutenant-Commander) Keith Lockhart, RNVR
 John Stratton as Sub-Lieutenant Gordon Ferraby, RNVR
 Denholm Elliott as Sub-Lieutenant (later Lieutenant) John Morell, RNVR
 John Warner as Sub-Lieutenant Baker, RNVR
 Stanley Baker as Lieutenant James Bennett, RANVR
 Bruce Seton as Petty Officer (later Chief Petty Officer) Bob Tallow (Coxswain)
 Liam Redmond as Chief Engine Room Artificer Jim Watts
 Virginia McKenna as Second Officer Julie Hallam, WRNS
 Moira Lister as Mrs Elaine Morell
 June Thorburn as Mrs Doris Ferraby
 Megs Jenkins as Mrs Gladys Bell (Tallow's sister)
 Meredith Edwards as Yeoman of Signals Wells
 Glyn Houston as Leading Seaman Phillips
 Alec McCowen as Leading Seaman Tonbridge
 Leo Phillips as Leading Torpedoman Wainwright
 Dafydd Havard as Signalman Rose
 Fred Griffiths as Leading Stoker Gracey
 Laurence Hardy as Leading Radar Mechanic Sellars
 Sam Kydd as Leading Steward Carslake
 John Singer as Stoker Grey
 Barry Steele as Engine Room Artificer Broughton
 Gerard Heinz as Polish Captain
 Gerik Schjelderup as Norwegian Captain
 Gaston Richer as French Captain
 Andrew Cruickshank as Scott-Brown
 Barry Letts as Raikes
 Kenn Kennedy as Allingham
 Harold Goodwin as ASDIC Operator
 George Curzon as Admiral at party
 Anthony Snell as RN Lieutenant
 Ronald Simpson as RN Captain
 Don Sharp as Lieutenant Commander
 Herbert C. Walton as the Waiter
 Jack Howard as a Survivor
 Russell Waters as ARP Warden
 Harold Jamieson as ARP Warden
 Warwick Ashton as Petty Officer Instructor

Production

Casting
Although the role of the cowardly officer Bennett was an Australian in the book, the Englishman Donald Sinden was originally screen-tested for the part and the Welshman Stanley Baker was screen-tested for the part of Lockhart. Subsequently, at Jack Hawkins' suggestion and after further screen-tests, the roles were swapped.

Future director Don Sharp had a small role. Virginia McKenna launched her career with her small role and met her first husband, Denholm Elliott, on the set.

Filming
The film was shot on location in Plymouth Naval Dockyard and the English Channel. Scenes showing the sailors in the water were shot in the open-air water-tank at Denham Studios. Other work was completed at Ealing studios.   The brief scenes showing Petty Officer Tallow coming home on leave were filmed in Stepney, London.  The crane jibs above the houses in the background were edited in as in reality, the docks were over a mile away.
 
Donald Sinden (playing Lockhart) suffered in real life from negative buoyancy, meaning that he was unable to float or swim in water, which was discovered while filming the sequence when the ship Compass Rose is sinking. Co-star Jack Hawkins (playing Ericson) saved him from drowning in Denham's open-air water-tank.

Editing
The most traumatic scene in the film occurs after a submarine has caused havoc to the convoy and the ASDIC (sonar detector) reveals that it is beneath a group of British sailors who are struggling in the water, hoping to be rescued. Ericson, faced with an appalling choice, drops the depth charges that will destroy the enemy but will also kill his countrymen. Yet for all his professionalism he is a human being and he later gets paralytically drunk and bares his feelings to Lockhart. Jack Hawkins, personally moved by the situation, delivered a fitting emotional performance and at the end of the scene tears were rolling down his face. Two days later, after seeing it cut together, Michael Balcon asked Charles Frend to re-shoot it with Hawkins keeping a grip on himself. It was played that way and Balcon pronounced it absolutely perfect. Then two days later, after another viewing, it was decided that a little emotion was needed after all; the scene was re-shot with just an odd tear or two and again the verdict was that it was now dead right. Hawkins was amused to note that in the final version of the film, the original first take was used.

In his second autobiography, Donald Sinden wrote:

Ships

Compass Rose was portrayed by the  HMS Coreopsis (K32). The Admiralty had disposed of all its wartime corvettes, but Coreopsis was located in Malta by one of the film's technical advisers, Capt. Jack Broome DSC RN (who had been escort commander of the ill-fated Convoy PQ 17). Coreopsis had been loaned to the Hellenic Navy and renamed Kriezis, and was awaiting a tow back to England and the breaker's yard. Compass Rose carries the pennant number "K49", which was in reality the number of HMS Crocus.

Although she had been paid off in 1947, she was held in reserve until broken up in 1958, and so could be made available for use in the film.

(In the book, the new ship which replaced Compass Rose was a fictional  HMS Saltash. These ships were significantly larger than the Castle-class corvettes, but had been paid off or sold abroad when the film was made. However, in 1954 a recommissioned Royal Canadian Navy River-class frigate  was made available to play the fictional HMS Rockhampton in the John Wayne film The Sea Chase.) In the film, when boarding their new ship, the characters of Ericson and Lockhart remark that neither of them have heard of a castle in Saltash – in reality there is no such thing, although there are a number of fortifications in the local area.

Both ships were based in Plymouth, with Plymouth Sound standing in for the River Mersey. The scenes of the ships at sea were filmed in the English Channel just out of sight of land. These coastal waters and a summer shooting schedule meant that the sea was generally too calm to effectively portray conditions on the Atlantic in winter, so the ships were taken to the Portland Race. Although only a couple of miles offshore, a number of conflicting tidal streams and a sandbank provide predictable, albeit often dangerous, large waves and a disturbed sea. Ships usually deliberately avoid the Portland Race but Compass Rose was taken straight through during the peak of the tide to get the required shots.

Reception

Box Office
It was the most successful film at the British box office in 1953 and caused Jack Hawkins to be voted the most popular star with British audiences.

Most British war films of this era performed poorly at the US box office; however, the film was one of the few to buck this trend. It earned £215,000 (approximately £4.9million by 2013 standards) in the United States, a high figure for British films at the time. (Variety reported this figure at US $600,000.).

Legacy
In 1956, according to the documentary Fifties British War Films: Days of Glory, when Elstree Studios was being sold to the BBC, Sir Michael Balcon was asked what had been his greatest achievement during his tenure. He replied "I think perhaps The Cruel Sea because when we saw that for the first time, we realised that we really had brought it off. It seemed to just gel and be absolutely right. Sometimes you don't get that feeling, but with that one we all did."

It is ranked number 75 on the British Film Institute's list of the top 100 British films.

The film has cult like status within the Royal Navy, with the mess deck tradition of “Cruel Sea Night” in which new mess joiners will watch the film whilst wearing life jackets and sprayed with water whenever HMS Compass Rose hits heavy weather or certain lines such as “Snorkers!” is said. This is a rite of passage for many members of the Royal Navy and is held with as high regard as crossing the line.

Halliwell's Film Guide described the film as a "competent transcription of a bestselling book, cleanly produced and acted".

See also
 BFI Top 100 British films
 Das Boot
Greyhound

References

Further reading
 George Perry, Forever Ealing: A Celebration of the Great British Film Studio'' (1981), Pavilion

External links
 
 
 
 
 
 HMCS Sackville, the only surviving Flower class corvette, located in Halifax, Nova Scotia, Canada

1953 films
1953 war films
British war films
British World War II films
Ealing Studios films
Films based on British novels
Films directed by Charles Frend
Films produced by Michael Balcon
Films set on ships
1950s English-language films
British black-and-white films
Royal Navy in World War II films
1950s British films